Bareggio is a comune (municipality) in the Metropolitan City of Milan in the Italian region Lombardy, located about  west of Milan.

Bareggio borders the following municipalities: Pregnana Milanese, Cornaredo, Sedriano, Cusago, Cisliano.

References

External links
 Official website

Cities and towns in Lombardy